The Artist and the City (Portuguese: O Pintor e a Cidade) is a 1956 short Portuguese documentary film directed by Manoel de Oliveira. The film shows a series of watercolor paintings by Portuguese artist António Cruz of what he sees while walking through different parts of the city of Porto. It was the first color film directed by Oliveira.

External links 
 

1956 films
Documentary films about painters
Films directed by Manoel de Oliveira
1956 short films
Portuguese short documentary films
1956 documentary films
Documentary films about cities
Culture in Porto
1950s short documentary films